Bolbitis is a genus of ferns in the family Dryopteridaceae, subfamily Elaphoglossoideae, in the Pteridophyte Phylogeny Group classification of 2016 (PPG I).

Two particular members of the genus are often grown as immersed water plants in aquaria, B. heudelotii, and B. heteroclita.  B. heudelotii, the African water fern, normally grows submerged in its native habitat, while B. heteroclita normally grows on the margin of water bodies, but will also grow submerged.

Species
, the Checklist of Ferns and Lycophytes of the World accepted the following species:

Bolbitis acrostichoides (Afzel. ex Sw.) Ching
Bolbitis aliena (Sw.) Alston
Bolbitis andreisii Fraser-Jenk. & Kandel
Bolbitis angustipinna (Hayata) Itô
Bolbitis appendiculata (Willd.) K.Iwats.
Bolbitis aspleniifolia (Bory) K.Iwats.
Bolbitis auriculata (Lam.) Alston
Bolbitis beddomei Fraser-Jenk. & Gandhi
Bolbitis bipinnatifida (Mett. ex Kuhn) Ching
Bolbitis cadieri (Christ) Ching
Bolbitis changjiangensis F.G.Wang & F.W.Xing
Bolbitis christensenii (Ching) Ching
Bolbitis confertifolia Ching
Bolbitis costata (Wall. ex Hook.) Ching
Bolbitis crispatula (Wall. ex Hook.) Ching
Bolbitis cuneata (Bonap.) Fraser-Jenk.
Bolbitis curupirae (Lindm.) Ching
Bolbitis deltigera ([Wall. ex] Hook.) C.Chr.
Bolbitis feeiana (Copel.) Fraser-Jenk. & Gandhi
Bolbitis fengiana (Ching) S.Y.Dong
Bolbitis fluviatilis (Hook.) Ching
Bolbitis gaboonensis (Hook.) Alston
Bolbitis gemmifera (Hieron.) C.Chr.
Bolbitis hainanensis Ching & C.H.Wang
Bolbitis hastata (Liebm. ex E.Fourn.) Hennipman
Bolbitis hekouensis Ching
Bolbitis helferiana (Kunze) K.Iwats.
Bolbitis heteroclita (C.Presl) Ching
Bolbitis heudelotii (Bory ex Fée) Alston
Bolbitis humblotii (Baker) Ching
Bolbitis interlineata (Copel.) Ching
Bolbitis lanceolata S.K.Wu & J.Y.Xiang
Bolbitis lianhuachihensis Y.S.Chao, Y.F.Huang & H.Y.Liu
Bolbitis lonchophora (Kunze) C.Chr.
Bolbitis longiflagellata (Bonap.) Ching
Bolbitis major (Bedd.) Hennipman
Bolbitis medogensis (Ching & S.K.Wu) S.Y.Dong
Bolbitis moranii J.B.Jiménez
Bolbitis nodiflora (Bory) Fraser-Jenk.
Bolbitis novoguineensis Hennipman
Bolbitis occidentalis R.C.Moran
Bolbitis pandurifolia (Hook.) Ching
Bolbitis portoricensis (Spreng.) Hennipman
Bolbitis prolifera (Bory) C.Chr. & Tardieu ex Tardieu & C.Chr.
Bolbitis quoyana (Gaudich.) Ching
Bolbitis rawsonii (Baker) Ching
Bolbitis repanda (Blume) Schott
Bolbitis rhizophylla (Kaulf.) Hennipman
Bolbitis rivularis (Brack.) Ching
Bolbitis salicina (Hook.) Ching
Bolbitis scalpturata (Fée) Ching
Bolbitis semicordata (Baker) Ching
Bolbitis semipinnatifida (Fée) Alston
Bolbitis serrata (Kuhn) Ching
Bolbitis serratifolia (Mert. ex Kaulf.) Schott
Bolbitis simplex R.C.Moran
Bolbitis sinensis (Baker) K.Iwats.
Bolbitis singaporensis Holttum
Bolbitis sinuata (C.Presl) Hennipman
Bolbitis subcordata (Copel.) Ching
Bolbitis subcrenata (Hook. & Grev.) Ching
Bolbitis taylorii (Bailey) Ching
Bolbitis tibetica Ching & S.K.Wu
Bolbitis tonkinensis (C.Chr. ex Ching) K.Iwats.
Bolbitis umbrosa (Liebm.) Ching
Bolbitis vanuaensis Brownlie
Bolbitis virens (Wall. ex Hook. & Grev.) Schott

References

 
Fern genera
Taxonomy articles created by Polbot